Mario Gregurina (born 23 March 1988 in Koprivnica) is a Croatian football midfielder, currently playing for NK Graničar Kotoriba.

Club career
He had a spell abroad, with Austrian side SV Rohrbach in 2018.

References

External links

Mario Gregurina at Sportnet.hr 

1988 births
Living people
Sportspeople from Koprivnica
Association football midfielders
Croatian footballers
Croatia youth international footballers
NK Slaven Belupo players
NK Koprivnica players
Croatian Football League players
Croatian expatriate footballers
Expatriate footballers in Austria
Croatian expatriate sportspeople in Austria